John McRae may refer to:
 John J. McRae, American politician in Mississippi
 John Rodney McRae, American murderer and suspected serial killer
 John Duncan McRae, member of the Legislative Assembly of British Columbia, 1949–1952
 John McRae (British Columbia politician), member of the Legislative Assembly of British Columbia, 1920–1924
 John McRae (bowls)

See also
 
 John McCrae, Canadian poet, physician, author, artist and soldier
 John McCrea (disambiguation)
 John MacRae (disambiguation)